Tapio is a male given name common in Finland. The nameday is 18 June. As of January 2013 there were almost 140,000 people with this name in Finland. The name originates from the name of the Finnish god of forests, animals, and hunting. A common nickname for Tapio is Tapsa. It is listed by the Finnish Population Register Centre as one of the top 10 most popular male given names ever. Notable people with the name include:

 Tapio Hakanen (better known as DJ Orkidea), Finnish electronic music artist
 Tapio Hämäläinen, a Finnish actor
 Tapio Kantanen, Finnish athlete
 Tapio Korjus, Finnish javelin thrower
 Tapio Laakso, Finnish professional ice hockey player 
 Tapio Laukkanen, Finnish rally driver
 Tapio Levo, Finnish ice hockey player 
 Tapio Luusua, Finnish freestyle skier
 Tapio Nurmela, Finnish Nordic combined athlete 
 Tapio Rautavaara, Finnish athlete, singer and actor
 Tapio Sipilä, Finnish wrestler
 Tapio Mäkelä, Finnish cross-country skier 
 Tapio Wilska, Finnish musician
 Tapio Wirkkala, Finnish designer and sculptor

References 

Finnish masculine given names